Grill-A-Burger is a hamburger restaurant in Palm Desert, California, United States. The business was featured on the Food Network's Diners, Drive-Ins & Dives in 2017. The interior decor has a jungle theme and features gorillas. In addition to burgers, the menu has included hot dogs and avocado fries.

References

External links 

 

Hamburger restaurants in the United States
Palm Desert, California
Restaurants in California